Eleanor of Vermandois also known as Eléonore de Vermandois or Aénor de Vermandois (1148 or 1149 – 19 or 21 June 1213) was ruling countess of Vermandois in 1182-1213 and by marriage countess of Ostervant, Nevers, Auxerre, Boulogne and Beaumont.

Early life
Eleanor was the daughter of Ralph I, Count of Vermandois, and his second spouse, Petronilla of Aquitaine. Eleanor was the youngest of three children born to her father by his second marriage. Eleanor's two siblings were Ralph II, Count of Vermandois and Elisabeth, Countess of Vermandois. She had an older half-brother from her father's first marriage: Hugh II, Count of Vermandois. A couple of years after the birth of Eleanor, her parents divorced; her father remarried to Laurette of Flanders in 1152 but died later that same year.

Marriages
Eleanor was married firstly in her mid-teens to Godfrey of Hainaut, Count of Ostervant, heir to his father Baldwin IV, Count of Hainaut. The couple married in 1162, however, Godfrey died the following year, whilst preparing for a journey to the territory of Palestine.

Her second marriage in 1164 was to William IV, Count of Nevers; this marriage was also brief lasting only four years when William died at Acre in 1168 on crusade.

A third marriage occurred in 1171 between Eleanor and Matthew, Count of Boulogne, who had divorced his first wife Marie, Countess of Boulogne the previous year. This marriage produced one child, a short lived daughter. No further children could be born as Matthew died in 1173 whilst fighting at the siege of Trenton (now Neufchatel-en-Bray); he was shot by an archer wielding a crossbow.

A fourth marriage took place in 1175 to Matthew III, Count of Beaumont. They were married for seventeen years - Eleanor's longest marriage - but they had no children and in 1192, Matthew and Eleanor divorced. 

Finally, according to de La Chesnaye Des Bois, she married Hugues III, sire d'Auxy, which would have been some time after her divorce from her previous marriage in 1192, and had issue. This would seem to contradict her arrangement with King Phillip II of France, whereby the County of Vermandois would go to any surviving children born to her instead of the King as it did upon her death (unless the children were removed from any such inheritance before her death).

Countess of Vermandois

Eleanor's older half-brother Hugh II abdicated to become a monk in 1160, her brother Ralph II died of leprosy in 1167, leaving no children and Eleanor's sister Elisabeth died in 1183. Her marriage to Philip I, Count of Flanders, had produced no children; therefore, Eleanor could then rightfully inherit the County of Vermandois.

Upon the death of Elisabeth, her widower Count Philip refused to pass over control of Vermandois to Eleanor; she then appealed to Philip II of France for support. Under the Treaty of La-Grange-Saint-Arnoul on 20 March 1182, Eleanor retained Valois, calling herself at that point Countess of Valois. Following Philip II of France's victory over the Flemish at Boves, she gained part of Vermandois and the entitled herself Countess of Vermandois.  With the death of Philip in 1192, she inherited the rest of Vermandois on the condition that Philip II would annex Vermandois into the royal domain if Eleanor died without children.

From that point onward, Eleanor reigned solely over Vermandois. Eleanor was remembered as a witty yet pious woman. She founded the Abbey of Parc-aux-Dames in Auger-Saint-Vincent, she loved poetry and gave the minister Renaud impetus to the Constitution of the Roman de Sainte-Geneviève. She also donated property to Notre-Dame by charter dated 1189. 

Eleanor died in 1213 at the age of sixty after a 21-year rule over Vermandois, and she was buried in the Abbey of Longpont (today she is buried in Aisne). Upon Eleanor's death, King Philip took over control of all of Eleanor's property.

Notes

References

Sources

1213 deaths
Eleanor
French countesses
1140s births
12th-century women rulers
13th-century women rulers
12th-century French women
12th-century French people
13th-century French women
13th-century French people